The 1980–81 Illinois Fighting Illini men's basketball team represented the University of Illinois.

Regular season
In 1981, Illinois made strides in its return to the national spotlight with a 21-8 record, a third-place Big Ten finish and an invitation to the NCAA Tournament. The team received a first-round bye in the NCAA tournament and beat Wyoming, 67-65, in Los Angeles to advance to the regionals in Salt Lake City, where Illinois lost to Kansas State, 57-52. During this season, the Fighting Illini led the Big Ten in scoring for the second consecutive season and were again led by Eddie Johnson and Mark Smith. Guards Craig Tucker and Derek Harper arrived to add backcourt punch, and Harper began his Illini career being named First-Team Freshman All-America by ESPN and ABC.

This season marked a change in location and name for the annual game with Missouri.  The name was altered from the "Show-Me Classic" to the "Braggin' Rights" and took on a permanent location, St. Louis, with the St. Louis Arena as its original home. Prior to 1980, the location of the game alternated from Assembly Hall and the Hearnes Center.  Since 1994, the game is played at the Scottrade Center.

Roster

Source

Schedule
																	
Source																																		
																		
|-																	
!colspan=12 style="background:#DF4E38; color:white;"| Non-Conference regular season
	

|-
!colspan=9 style="background:#DF4E38; color:#FFFFFF;"|Big Ten regular season	

 

|-
!colspan=9 style="text-align: center; background:#DF4E38"|NCAA Tournament

|-

Player stats

Awards and honors
 Eddie Johnson
Fighting Illini All-Century team (2005)
Team Most Valuable Player 
Derek Harper
Fighting Illini All-Century team (2005)

Team players drafted into the NBA

Rankings

References

Illinois
Illinois
Illinois Fighting Illini men's basketball seasons
Illinois
Illinois